Since the Supreme Court of the United States was established in 1789, 114 persons have served on the court. Of these, several also served in the United States Congress, either before or after their tenure as a justice. Six were incumbent members of the Senate at the time of their appointment, while one—James Moore Wayne—was an incumbent member of the House of Representatives. The others had previously served in the Senate or the House or both. Additionally, one justice—David Davis—resigned from the Supreme Court to serve in the Senate.

Senators
There have been 14 Supreme Court justices with prior service in the Senate, and one with subsequent Senate service.

Representatives
There have been 17 Supreme Court justices with prior service in the House of Representatives.

Notes

See also
List of people who have served in all three branches of the United States federal government

References

Congress
Supreme Court